HD 114533, also known as HR 4976, is a solitary star located in the southern circumpolar constellation Chamaeleon. It has an apparent magnitude of 5.84, making it faintly visible to the naked eye. At its current distance, HD 114533A's brightness is diminished by 0.74 magnitudes due to interstellar dust. It has an absolute magnitude of −2.0.

This is an evolved supergiant with a stellar classification of G2 Ib. It has also been given class of F8 Ib, indicating a slightly hotter star. It has 3.78 times the mass of the Sun but has expanded to 77.3 times its girth.

References

Chamaeleon (constellation)
F-type supergiants
G-type supergiants
Chamaeleontis, 44
PD -77 890
114533
64587
4976